, from Yamagata Prefecture, was a professor of zoology at  which was amalgamated into Hiroshima University by the enactment of National School Establishment Law and the above-mentioned Hiroshima University after the amalgamation.

He, graduate from University of Tokyo, was the first Japanese scientist to study kinorhynchs, and one such animal, Dracoderes abei,  was named after him. Also named after him was Abe's salamander and Abe's Whiskered Bat, Myotis abei Yoshikura 1944, as a tribute from one of his students.

References

20th-century Japanese zoologists
Japanese mammalogists
1891 births
1960 deaths